The National Association was a political party in South Korea.

History
Syngman Rhee established the Central Committee for the Rapid Realisation of Korean Independence in October 1945, shortly after he had returned from exile. As a result of widespread opposition to the Moscow Conference, the Committee gained the backing of the leaders of the provisional government and several political parties, including the Korea Democratic Party, the Korean Independence Party and a faction of the Communist Party.

The Communist Party faction later withdrew its support, but the others involved formed the National Association for the Rapid Realisation of Korean Independence (NARRKI) on 8 February 1946. The new party opposed the proposed trusteeship, but when Rhee called for separate elections to be held in South Korea, President Kim Koo and others left the party. In the 1948 elections it won 55 of the 200 seats, emerging as the largest party.

The party was subsequently renamed the "National Association". In the 1950 elections it was reduced to 14 seats, finishing third behind the Democratic Nationalist Party and the Korea Nationalist Party. In 1951 Rhee established the Liberal Party. However, the National Association remained extant until the end of his presidency in 1960. It won three seats in the 1954 elections, but lost parliamentary representation in the 1958 elections.

Election results

President

Vice-President

Constitutional Assembly

House of Representatives

References

Defunct political parties in South Korea
1946 establishments in South Korea
Conservative parties in South Korea
Far-right politics in South Korea
Political parties established in 1946
Right-wing parties in Asia